Miomir Vukobratović (December 24, 1931 – March 11, 2012) was a Serbian mechanical engineer and pioneer in humanoid robots. His major interest were in the development of efficient modeling and control of robot dynamics. He was born in Botoš, near Zrenjanin, Kingdom of Yugoslavia.

Education
Vukobratović received the B.Sc. and Ph.D. degrees in Mechanical Engineering from the University of Belgrade in 1957 and 1964, respectively, and the D.Sc. degree from the Institute Mashinovedeniya, Soviet (now Russian) Academy of Sciences, Moscow, 1972.

From 1968 he was head of the Biodynamics Department, director of the Laboratory for Robotics and Flexible Automation and director of Robotics Laboratory at the Mihailo Pupin Institute in Belgrade.

Research

Most of Vukobratović’s research work was related with robot dynamics. He contributed to manipulators’ dynamics in adaptive and non-adaptive control for contact and non-contact tasks. He also studied dynamic modeling and control in locomotion robots. In 1970 Vukobratović proposed a theoretical model to explain and control biped locomotion. The fundamental concept of his model is called the Zero Moment Point. He died in 2012 in Belgrade.

Awards and honors

 In 1976 he was awarded the 7th July Award, the highest award of Serbia, for his outstanding achievements in robotics.
 In 1979 he and his coauthor D. Stokic received the October Prize of Belgrade for their research monograph: Dynamic Control of Manipulators.
 In 1982 he was awarded the AVNOJ Award, the highest Yugoslav award, for his highest achievements in Robotics and Cybernetics.
 In 1994 he received the Saint Sava Medal of First Order, the highest award of Serbian church, for his world pioneering result in rehabilitation robotics.
In 1994 he was elected as a member of Serbian Academy of Sciences and Arts in the Department of Technical Sciences.
 Diplomas holder of honored professor at Harbin Institute of Technology and Far Eastern Technical University at Vladivostok (Russia).
 In 1996 he was awarded the Joseph F. Engelberger award from the Robotic Industries Association in the USA, for his pioneering results in applied research and education in robotics.
 Doctor Honoris Causa of Moscow State M.V. Lomonosov University .
 Doctor Honoris Causa of University of Novi Sad (Serbia). 
 Doctor Honoris Causa of Technical University at Timișoara (Romania).

References

External links 
Miomir Vukobratović's Home Page

1931 births
2012 deaths
Serbian inventors
Serbian roboticists
Members of the Serbian Academy of Sciences and Arts
Foreign Members of the USSR Academy of Sciences
Foreign Members of the Russian Academy of Sciences
People from Zrenjanin
University of Belgrade Faculty of Mechanical Engineering alumni
Foreign members of the Chinese Academy of Engineering